Body of water is an accumulation of water on the surface of a planet.

Body of water may also refer to:
 Body of Water (film), a 2011 Finnish drama film
Body of Water (musical), a 2014 musical
Bodies of Water, an American band
Phytotelma, a body or reservoir of water held by a plant
Bodies of Water, an extended play from American band Make Do and Mend
Waterbodies (band), a garage rock band